Chhipahrmai (Nepali: छिपहरमाई ) is a rural municipality in Parsa District in Madhesh Province of Nepal. It was formed in 2016 occupying current 5 sections (wards) from previous 5 former VDCs. It occupies an area of 24.90 km2 with a total population of 26,671.
Manoj Gupta is the president of Chhipaharmai Rural Municipality.

References 

Populated places in Parsa District
Rural municipalities of Nepal established in 2017
Rural municipalities in Madhesh Province